Marsden State School is a school located at Hickory Street, Marsden, QLD. The School was established in 1978. There are laptop classes.

See also
 List of schools in Greater Brisbane

References

External links
 Marsden State School website

Public schools in Queensland
Schools in Logan City
Educational institutions established in 1978
1978 establishments in Australia